Darling Violetta is an American dark wave band based in Hollywood, California, United States. Their name is taken from the salutation used by Bela Lugosi in letters to his mistress, Violetta Napierska.  The band released their first EP Bath-Water-Flowers in 1997, though this work is commonly considered an album by most sources.  Two songs were performed by the band in the episode "Faith, Hope & Trick" of the television series Buffy the Vampire Slayer (season 3, episode 3), "Blue Sun" from Bath-Water-Flowers and "Cure" from The Kill You EP. The following year, the band, with producer Holly Knight, composed and recorded the theme for Angel, the spinoff series from Buffy.

Biography
In 1999, Darling Violetta released The Kill You EP and a music video for its song "Spoiled and Rotten."  In 2003, they released the album Parlour.

In 2005, the band composed an extended version of the Angel theme called "The Sanctuary Extended Remix", featured on the soundtrack of the series Angel: Live Fast, Die Never.

The style of the band is recognizable for the voice of singer Cami Elen (compared by some critics to that of PJ Harvey), the use of cello, particularly in their early compositions, and lyrics charged with sexual innuendo, dark metaphor and goth references.

Darling Violetta's song "I Want to Kill You", produced by Holly Knight, from The Kill You EP was licensed by Activision for their game, Vampire: The Masquerade – Redemption. They also contributed another song to the Masquerade Universe which was in Vampire: The Masquerade – Bloodlines entitled "A Smaller God" from the album Parlour.

In late 2009, Thomas and Elen reported recording songs for their fourth as yet untitled release.

As of January 2018, Elen reports that Darling Violetta is on an 'extended hiatus'.

Band members
Cami Elen - Vocals

Former members:
Atto Attie - Bass
Steve McManus - Drums
Chris Pott - Bass
Jymm Thomas - Guitar

Featured players:
Gerri Sutyak - Cello
Michael Renninger - Bass

Discography

LP
 Parlour (2003)

EP
 Bath Water Flowers (1997)
 The Kill You EP (1999)

References

External links
 
 

Musical groups established in 1997
American dark wave musical groups
Angel (1999 TV series)
Dream pop musical groups